The 2000 Cyprus International Tournament was an winter international football friendly tournament held in Cyprus, between 2 and 6 February 2000.
Besides the host nation Cyprus, Lithuania, Romania, Lativa, Slovakia, Georgia, Armenia and Moldova participated in the tournament.

Contests were held among the losers of the quarterfinal matches to determine the fifth to eighth places.

Matches

Consolation tournament

Quarter-finals

Semi-finals

Third place match

Final

Winner

Consolation tournament

Semi-finals

Seventh place match

Fifth place match

Statistics

Goalscorers

See also 
China Cup
Malta International Football Tournament

References

External links 
 Cyprus International Tournament 2000

1999–2000 in Cypriot football
1999–2000 in Romanian football
International association football competitions hosted by Cyprus